USS Thistle has been the name of more than one United States Navy ship, and may refer to:

 , a steamer in commission from 1862 to 1865
 , a patrol boat in commission from 1917 to 1918

Thistle